NJ PBS (known as NJTV prior to 2021) is a public television network serving the U.S. state of New Jersey. The network is owned by the New Jersey Public Broadcasting Authority (NJPBA), an agency of the New Jersey state government which owns the licenses for all but one of the PBS member stations licensed in the state. NJPBA outsources the network's operations to Public Media NJ, a wholly-owned subsidiary of New York City-based The WNET Group (formerly known as the Educational Broadcasting Corporation and later as WNET.org), the parent company of Newark, New Jersey–licensed WNET (channel 13) and Garden City, New York–licensed WLIW (channel 21). In addition to PBS programming, NJ PBS airs shows distributed by American Public Television (APT); the network also produces and broadcasts its own programs, mostly related to issues in New Jersey. NJ PBS' operations are based in Englewood, New Jersey. Its anchor studio is located at Gateway Center in Newark. Master control and some internal operations are based at WNET's studios in the Worldwide Plaza complex in Midtown Manhattan.

NJ PBS is the successor to New Jersey Network (NJN), the state-controlled public television and radio service. NJN ceased operations on June 30, 2011, and Public Media NJ took control of the former NJN television stations the following day.

History

In 2008, officials with the New Jersey Network asked the New Jersey Legislature in 2008 for permission to explore making NJN an independent nonprofit organization. Under this scenario, the NJN licenses would have been transferred to the network's fundraising arm, the NJN Foundation. However, on June 6, 2011, New Jersey's Governor during that time, Chris Christie, who vowed to end state-funded public broadcasting when he took office in 2010, announced an agreement to turn control of the NJN television network to WNET. As part of the deal, WNET.org created Public Media NJ as a separate New Jersey-based nonprofit to operate the stations. Ironically, NJN had been created in 1971 partly due to concerns that WNET and Philadelphia's main PBS outlet, WHYY-TV (channel 12), weren't adequately serving their New Jersey viewers.

Under the terms of the deal, the NJPBA would retain the licenses, but outsource the stations' operations to Public Media NJ for five years with two additional five-year renewal options. Public Media NJ would receive funding from the Corporation for Public Broadcasting (CPB) and all revenues related to the former NJN technical operations. The measure was defeated by the state assembly on June 23, 2011. The state senate, however, passed the resolution on June 27, allowing Public Media NJ to take over NJN's television operations as scheduled on July 1, 2011. The network was relaunched as NJTV; all members of NJN automatically became members of NJTV. The first program to be aired on NJTV was Charlie Rose (which was produced by its sister station WNET).

On July 26, 2011, NJTV announced a partnership with the Foundation for New Jersey Public Broadcasting (formerly the NJN Foundation) to jointly fund and create additional public affairs programming. NJTV and the NJN Foundation merged in September 2012.

Rebranding
On February 24, 2021, NJTV rebranded as "NJ PBS," adapting to the 2019 PBS rebrand recommended to its local stations.

Programming
The Caucus Educational Corporation (CEC), a non-profit producer of New Jersey-focused public affairs programs, is under contract with Public Media NJ and WNET to provide original programming for NJ PBS. CEC produces Caucus: New Jersey, State of Affairs, and One on One with Steve Adubato, which are hosted by Steve Adubato. CEC also produced the New Jersey Capitol Report, which ended after a seven-year run in March 2017. NJ PBS also broadcasts programming distributed by PBS, American Public Television, and additional local productions.

Locally produced programming 
American Songbook at NJPAC
Classroom Closeup NJ
Driving Jersey
Due Process
On the Record
Que Pasa NJ
Reporters Roundtable
State of the Arts
This is South Jersey

News programming
At the inauguration of NJ PBS (as NJTV), the network launched NJ Today, a half-hour newscast that replaced NJN News and was aired at its former weekday time slots of 6, 7:30 and 11 p.m. It was originally anchored by WNET personality Rafael Pi Roman. Mike Schneider later took over the anchor role. It was renamed to NJTV News on November 4, 2013. On June 12, 2014, Schneider announced his retirement as anchor on NJTV News and was replaced by veteran journalist Mary Alice Williams on July 1. Williams later left the newscast after March 13, 2020 to help care for family members who were suffering from health problems. She eventually announced the following month on April 27, 2020 that she would step down as anchor of NJTV News. She was succeeded by Briana Vannozzi, who has anchored the newscast since March 15, 2020. She was an interim anchor until September 9, 2020 when she became a full-time anchor. Schneider still appears on other WNET and NJTV-produced programs, including WNET's Metrofocus. NJTV News is produced at the Agnes Varis studio in Two Gateway Center in Newark. The newscast can also be seen on sister station WNET and online via YouTube and on NJTV's website. Because of WNET (as well as its sister station WLIW) and WHYY carrying PBS NewsHour, NJ PBS does not carry that program, to avoid unnecessary duplication.

Michael Aron, NJN's news director at its closure and a former member of the foundation's board, revived his former NJN programs Reporters Roundtable and On the Record on NJTV. He also appears on NJTV News as its chief political correspondent.

On October 5, 2020, NJTV's newsroom merged with the New Jersey news site NJ Spotlight (which was acquired by WNET in 2019) and the newscasts were rebranded as NJ Spotlight News. In May 2022, NJ Spotlight News released its first podcast series, Hazard NJ, hosted by journalist Jordan Gass-Pooré.

Lottery drawings
When NJN shut down operations, no New Jersey Lottery drawings were aired until September 8, 2011, on a tape delay. Before this happened, the New Jersey Lottery had no other outlet to showcase any of their live drawings except via online live streaming services such Ustream and Livestream.com. NJTV continued hosting the tape-delayed drawings until January 1, 2013, when the drawings were moved to two CBS owned stations, WLNY and WPSG-TV. From 2014 to 2020, lottery drawings were aired live on WPIX and WPHL-TV. As of 2020, no drawings for the state lottery are televised; instead the Lottery's afternoon, evening and Cash4Life drawings  are carried on the Lottery's website and social media platforms. Powerball and Mega Millions drawings were never aired on NJTV as WTXF-TV and WABC-TV air these drawings (with the latter occasionally airing Powerball drawings at certain occasions).

Stations

NJ PBS' four full-power stations reach a potential audience of almost 28 million people in parts of six states—all of New Jersey, plus parts of New York, Connecticut, Pennsylvania, Delaware, and even Maryland. While this gives NJ PBS one of the largest potential audiences in the country, it also must compete directly against three of the most-watched PBS member stations in the country–sister stations WNET and WLIW, as well as WHYY-TV. Additionally, WLVT-TV (channel 39) in Allentown, Pennsylvania, overlaps some of NJ PBS' broadcast area.

In the FCC incentive auction concluded in 2017, WNJN and WNJT's spectrum was sold back to the FCC for $138,059,363 and $193,892,273, respectively. NJ PBS has announced that these stations will share spectrum with the two remaining stations, WNJS and WNJB respectively. On January 23, 2018, per FCC filings, WNJN began channel-sharing with WNJB and WNJT began channel-sharing with WNJS.

Notes

Translators

Cable and satellite availability
NJ PBS is available on all New Jersey cable providers, along with most cable, satellite and IPTV providers in the New York (utilizing WNJN/WNJB) and Philadelphia (utilizing WNJS/WNJT) television markets, into New York State, Delaware, and Pennsylvania (with some limited availability in Fairfield County, Connecticut, and Cecil County, Maryland).

Technical information

Subchannels
The digital signals of the NJ PBS stations are multiplexed:

References

External links

NJ Spotlight News website

2011 establishments in New Jersey
Englewood, New Jersey
Mass media in Newark, New Jersey
PBS member networks
Television channels and stations established in 2011
Television stations in New Jersey